Saghuyeh (also Romanized as Sāghūyeh; also known as Sāqū’īyeh and Sātū’īyeh) is a village in Tujerdi Rural District, Sarchehan District, Bavanat County, Fars Province, Iran. At the 2006 census, its population was 234, in 49 families.

References 

Populated places in Sarchehan County